Driouch Province is a province in Morocco that was formed in 2009 by dividing the Nador Province into two parts, all falling under the Oriental administrative region of northeastern Morocco. The province of Driouch has a population of 222,987 people as of 2004.

Subdivisions
The province is divided administratively into the following:

References

 
Driouch